Gabriel Bergmoser (born 1991) is an Australian author and playwright. Raised in the rural town of Mansfield, Victoria, Bergmoser completed his master's degree in screenwriting at the Victorian College of the Arts. Bergmoser's first novel was Boone Shepard.

Early life and education 
Gabriel Bergmoser was born in 1991 and was raised in the rural town of Mansfield. He is a graduate of the Victorian College of the Arts (VCA).

Career 
Bergmoser won the Sir Peter Ustinov Television Scriptwriting Award in 2015 for his screenplay Windmills.

Bergmoser's playscript The Trial of Dorian Gray, which is based on The Picture of Dorian Gray (1891) by Oscar Wilde, premiered at the 2019 Midsumma Festival in Melbourne directed by Peter Blackburn. A negative review in The Sydney Morning Herald said that Bergmoser had "a bright future", but criticized the script for failing to meet its potential and "engage critically with our censorious present [...] flashes of Wildean wit are few and far between, and precise expression sometimes eludes [Bergmoser]."

His play The Critic was performed several times throughout Melbourne, including at Club Volitare in North Melbourne in 2016 and at the 2019 Melbourne Fringe Festival. A review in the Herald praised it as a "amusing piece of metatheatre" that addresses its themes with "nuance".

2020–2022: Two-book deal with HarperCollins 
In 2019, Bergmoser signed a two-book deal with HarperCollins.

The first of the books and Bergmoser's debut adult novel, The Hunted, was released in Australia in April 2020 to positive reviews. 

In 2022, Bergmoser was reported by Variety to be attached to write the script of Vertigo Entertainment's adaptation of the survival horror webtoon GremoryLand.

Personal life 
Bergmoser resides in Melbourne, Victoria.

Bibliography

Novels
 The True Color of a Little White Lie (2021)

Boone Shepard series
Boone Shepard (2016)
Boone Shepard's American Adventure (2017)
Boone Shepard: The Silhouette and the Sacrifice (2018)

Short Stories
"Boone Shepard and the Californian Catastrophe"
"Boone Shepard and the Alpine Adversity"
"Boone Shepard and the Loot of Loch Ness"
"Boone Shepard and the Terrible Theft on Tiberius Train"
"The Broken Record: A Boone Shepard Adventure"

Hunted series
The Hunted (2020)
The Inheritance (2021)

Audible Originals

The Consequence (2021)
The Hitchhiker (2022)

Plays
Reunion (2013)
We Can Work It Out (2015)
The Lucas Conundrum (2016)
Regression (2016)
The Critic (2016)
Springsteen (2017)
Heroes (2017)
The Commune (2017)
Moonlite (2018) - musical (music by Dan Nixon)
The Trial of Dorian Gray (2019)

Screenplays
The Pact - 2020 web series, 3 episodes
Pencil Pals - 2020 TV series, 1 episode

Awards 
2015: Sir Peter Ustinov Television Scriptwriting Award for Windmills

References

External links 
 Official website

1991 births
Living people
21st-century Australian male writers
21st-century Australian novelists
21st-century Australian short story writers
Australian male dramatists and playwrights
Writers from Melbourne